The 1982–83 Algerian Championnat National was the 21st season of the Algerian Championnat National since its establishment in 1962. A total of 16 teams contested the league, with JE Tizi-Ouzou as the defending champions, The Championnat started on September 17, 1982. and ended on June 17, 1983.

Team summaries

Promotion and relegation 
Teams promoted from Algerian Division 2 1982–1983 
 Chlef SO
 JS Bordj Ménaïel

Teams relegated to Algerian Division 2 1983–1984
 ISM Aïn Béïda
 USK Alger

League table

Statistics

Hat-tricks

Note
4 Player scored 4 goals

References

External links
1982–83 Algerian Championnat National
 1982–83 Algerian Championnat National at footballvintage.net 

Algerian Championnat National
Championnat National
Algerian Ligue Professionnelle 1 seasons